Getaneh Tamire Molla (born 10 January 1994) is an Ethiopian male long-distance runner who competes over distances up to 10K. He was the gold medallist in the 5000 metres at the 2015 African Games.

Geteneh's first success at national level came at the 2015 Ethiopian Athletics Championships where he won the 5000 m title. This earned him a spot on the national team for the 2015 African Games, where he became champion.

In 2016 he won both the national title at the Jan Meda Cross Country and defended his 5000 m title at the track championships. He was outside the individual medals in international competition that year, taking sixth at the 2016 African Cross Country Championships and fourth at the 2016 African Championships in Athletics. He did, however, lead the Ethiopian men's cross country team to bronze in the team event. He ended the year with a win at the Silvesterlauf Trier then opened the new year with another win at the Cross Ouest-France.

Getaneh earned his first national selection for a world event by defending his Ethiopian title at the 2017 Jan Meda Cross Country, beating Ibrahim Jeilan and Imane Merga among others.

International competitions

1st at Riyadh half marathon men 21000 m

National titles
Ethiopian Athletics Championships
5000 m: 2015, 2016
Ethiopian Cross Country Championships
Senior race: 2016, 2017

Circuit wins
Silvesterlauf Trier: 2016
Cross Ouest-France: 2017

See also
List of African Games medalists in athletics (men)

References

External links

Living people
1994 births
Ethiopian male long-distance runners
African Games gold medalists for Ethiopia
African Games medalists in athletics (track and field)
Athletes (track and field) at the 2015 African Games
20th-century Ethiopian people
21st-century Ethiopian people